Curthwaite was a railway station on the Maryport and Carlisle Railway (M&CR) serving West Curthwaite and Thursby in Cumbria. The station was opened by the M&CR in 1843 and lay in the Parish of Westward.

History 
Curthwaite station was opened by the Maryport & Carlisle Railway in 1843. At grouping in 1923 the M&CR became a part of the London, Midland and Scottish Railway. It was closed by the British Transport Commission in 1950 (as an economy measure), two years after the railway system was nationalised.

The main Carlisle-Maryport line (completed in 1845) remains open and forms part of the Cumbrian Coast Line between Carlisle and Barrow in Furness.

The station had two through platforms, with a station building that survives as a private house and also a water tower that survives and is now a listed building. The platforms have been demolished.

References 
Notes

Sources
 

Further reading
 
 

Disused railway stations in Cumbria
Former Maryport and Carlisle Railway stations
Railway stations in Great Britain opened in 1843
Railway stations in Great Britain closed in 1950
1843 establishments in England